IoMT may refer to:
 Internet of Military Things, networked devices for combat operations and warfare in the Internet of things
 Internet of Media Things, networked digital media systems in the Internet of things using the international standard ISO/IEC 23093 of the Moving Picture Experts Group (MPEG)
 Internet of Medical Things, networked medical devices in the Internet of things